Sunnydale is an unincorporated community in Thurston County, in the U.S. state of Washington. The community is situated on Old Highway 99 between Grand Mound and Tenino.

History
Sunnydale took its name from a nearby poultry farm.

Parks and recreation
Millersylvania State Park is north of the area, and Sunnydale lies east of the Scatter Creek Wildlife Recreation Area.

References

Unincorporated communities in Thurston County, Washington